Should a Girl Marry? is a 1928 American silent crime film directed by Scott Pembroke and starring Helen Foster, Donald Keith and William V. Mong.

Cast
 Helen Foster as Alice Dunn 
 Donald Keith as Jerry Blaine 
 William V. Mong as Andrew Blaine 
 Andy Clyde as Harry 
 Dot Farley as Mae Reynolds 
 George Chesebro as Jarvin 
 Dorothy Vernon as Aunt Ada

References

Bibliography
 Langman, Larry. American Film Cycles: The Silent Era. Greenwood Publishing, 1998.

External links
 

1928 films
1928 crime films
American crime films
Films directed by Scott Pembroke
American black-and-white films
Rayart Pictures films
1920s English-language films
1920s American films